Blaine Allen Thacker QC, (January 11, 1941 – February 17, 2020) served as a Member of Parliament in the Lethbridge riding from 1979 to 1993 (Elected to the House of Commons in 1979, 1980, 1984 & 1988 for a total of 5,270 days).

Parliamentary service included:

· Parliamentary Secretary to the Minister of Consumer and Corporate Affairs

· Parliamentary Secretary to the Minister of State (Agriculture)

· Parliamentary Secretary to the Minister of Transport

· Critic, Consumer and Corporate Affairs

· Critic, Environment

Committee service included:

· Legislative Committee G on Bill C-35 An Act to correct certain anomalies, inconsistencies, archaisms and errors in the Statutes of Canada, to deal with other matters of a non-controversial and uncomplicated nature therein and to repeal certain provisions thereof that have expired or lapsed or otherwise ceased to have effect

· Legislative Committee G on Bill C-49 An Act to amend the
Criminal Code (sexual assault)(Chair)

· Legislative Committee H on Bill C-17 An Act to amend the
Criminal Code and the Customs Tariff in consequence
thereof (Chair)

· Legislative Committee H on Bill C-328 An Act respecting
National Public Service Week: Serving Canadians Better
(Chair)

· Legislative Committee H on Bill C-40 An Act to provide for
the continuation of postal services (Chair)

· Legislative Committee on BIl C-41 An Act to amend the
Judges Act, the Federal Court Act and the Tax Court of
Canada Act

· Legislative Committee on Bill C-109 An Act to amend the
Criminal Code, the Crown Liability and Proceedings Act and
the Radiocommunication Act

· Legislative Committee on Bill C-113 An Act to amend the
Criminal Code and the Canada Evidence Act

· Legislative Committee on Bill C-114 An Act to amend the
Criminal Code and the Customs Tariff

· Legislative Committee on Bill C-115 An Act to implement the
North American Free Trade Agreement (Chair)

· Legislative Committee on Bill C-15 An Act to amend the
Criminal Code and the Canada Evidence Act

· Legislative Committee on Bill C-205 An Act to protect
heritage railway stations

· Legislative Committee on Bill C-21 An Act to exempt certain
shipping conference practices from the provisions of
the Competition Act, to repeal the Shipping Conferences
Exemption Act, 1979 and to amend other Acts in
consequence thereof

· Legislative Committee on Bill C-210 An Act to amend the
Blue Water Bridge Authority Act

· Legislative Committee on Bill C-210 An Act to amend the
Criminal Code and the Supreme Court Act (habeas corpus)

· Legislative Committee on Bill C-263 An Act to amend the
Canada Post Corporation Act (exclusive privilege)

· Legislative Committee on Bill C-30 An Act to amend the
National Parks Act and to amend An Act to amend the
National Parks Act

· Legislative Committee on Bill C-305 Victoria Cross Act
(Chair)

· Legislative Committee on Bill C-38 An Act to amend the
Federal Court Act, the Crown Liability Act, the Supremne
Court Act and other Acts in consequence thereof

· Legislative Committee on Bill C-49 An Act to amend the
Criminal Code (prostitution)

· Legislative Committee on Bill C-52 An Act respecting the
use of foreign ships and non-duty paid ships in the coasting
trade and in other marine activities of a commercial nature

· Legislative Committee on Bill C-57 An Act to provide for the
protection of integrated circuit topographies and to amend
certain Acts in consequence thereof

· Legislative Committee on Bill C-59 An Act to amend various
Acts to give effect to the reconstitution of the courts in
British Columbia

· Legislative Committee on Bill C-60 An Act to amend various
Acts to give effect to the reconstitution of the courts in
Ontario and to provide for other related matters

· Legislative Committee on Bill C-61 An Act to amend the
Criminal Code, the Food and Drugs Act and the Narcotic
Control Act

· Legislative Committee on Bill C-65 An Act to amend the
Royal Canadian Mounted Police Act and other Acts in
consequence thereof

· Legislative Committee on Bill C-69 An Act to amend the
Criminal Code (air and maritime safety)

· Legislative Committee on Bill C-70 An Act to amend the
Criminal Code (jury)

·  Legislative Committee on Bill C-78 An Act to amend the
Governor General’s Act, the Governor General’s Retiring
Annuity Act, the Salaries Act and the Judges Act

· Legislative Committee on Bill C-79 An Act to amend
the Divorce Act and the Family Orders and Agreements
Enforcement Assistance Act

· Legislative Committee on Bill C-81 An Act to amend the
Criminal Code (lotteries)

· Legislative Committee on BIll C-81 An Act to implement the
United Nations Convention on Contracts for the International
Sale of Goods

· Legislative Committee on Bill C-81 An Act to provide for
referendums on the Constitution of Canada (Chair)

· Legislative Committee on Bill C-83 An Act to amend the Tax
Rebate Discounting Act

· Legislative Committee on Bill C-86 An Act to amend the
Canada Deposit Insurance Corporation Act (Chair)

· Legislative Committee on Bill C-90 Criminal Code (amdt. -
sentencing)

· Legislative Committee on Bill S-14 An Act respecting the
laws prohibiting marriage between related persons

· Legislative Committee on Bills C-67 An Act to amend the
Parole Act and the Penitentiary Act and C-68 An Act to
amend the Parole Act, the Penitentiary Act, the Prisons and
Reformatories Act and the Criminal Code

· Special Committee on Standing Orders and Procedure

· Special Committee on the Federal-Provincial Fiscal
Arrangements

· Special Committee on the Review of the CSIS Act and the
Security Offences Act (Chair)

· Special Joint Committee on Bill C-116, Conflict of Interests

· Special Joint Committee on Senate Reform

· Special Joint Committee to review the subject-matter of
Bill C-43, Members of the Senate and House of Commons
Conflict of Interests Act

· Standing Committee on Agriculture

· Standing Committee on Consumer and Corporate Affairs
and Government Operations

· Standing Committee on Finance, Trade and Economic Affairs

· Standing Committee on Justice and Legal Affairs (Chair)

· Standing Committee on Justice and Solicitor General (Chair)

· Standing Committee on Labour, Manpower and Immigration

· Standing Committee on Privileges and Elections

· Standing Committee on Procedure and Organization

· Standing Committee on Public Accounts

· Standing Joint Committee on Printing

· Subcommittee on National Security of the Standing Committee on Justice and Legal Affairs (Chair)

· Subcommittee on the Recodification of the General Part of
the Criminal Code of the Standing Committee on Justice and
Solicitor General (Chair)

References
 
 Memorial Service Booklet, Dec. 15, 2020, Canadian Association of Former Parliamentarians

1941 births
2020 deaths
Members of the House of Commons of Canada from Alberta
Progressive Conservative Party of Canada MPs